Christián Herc (born 30 September 1998) is a Slovak professional football midfielder. He is currently signed to Grasshopper Club Zürich, where he plays as a midfielder and he is also a part of the Slovak national team.

Club career

Loan to DAC 1904 Dunajská Streda
Herc made his professional Fortuna Liga debut for DAC Dunajská Streda against Senica on 18 February 2018. He came on as a replacement for Zsolt Kalmár in the 83rd minute of the match. DAC won the game 0:2. By the end of the 2017–18 season, Herc made a total of 13 appearances for Dunajská Streda, scoring 3 goals.

He scored his first Fortuna liga goal against Zemplín Michalovce in his second game, on 24 February 2018. He replaced Marko Divković in a 77th minute substitution and scored a stoppage time goal to mark the 2:0 win, after a pass from Lukáš Čmelík. Later on in the championship group, on 22 April, he scored two of three in a 3:2 win over MŠK Žilina at the pod Dubňom. 

Throughout the 2018–19 season, Herc was an important player for Dunajská Streda. He was featured in 29 of 32 league fixtures and scored 3 further goals. He was also featured in all four DAC games in Europa League qualifying rounds, against Dinamo Tbilisi and Dinamo Minsk.

Loan to Viktoria Plzeň
On 5 June 2019, it was announced that Herc would join Viktoria Plzeň since the following season, on a two-year loan with an option to buy, from Wolverhampton. His move was largely seen as a replacement for Patrik Hrošovský, who was the play-maker at Viktoria for some 7 years, guiding them to three titles as champions and one cup triumph. Although at the time of the announcements of Herc's move Hrošovský's transfer was not definite, it was rumoured that he was to head to Genk.

Loan to Karviná
On 25 August 2020, having been recalled from his planned two-year stay with Viktoria Plzeň, Herc moved on loan to another Czech side, this time joining Karviná for the 2020–21 season. He completed the season with 6 goals and 31 league appearances.

Grasshopper Zürich
In the summer of 2021, Herc had signed a two-year contract with Grasshopper Zürich, who had re-gained promotion to Swiss Super League. He gave his debut in the first game of the season against FC Basel. The team lost the game 0-2 and Herc received a booking in the 40th minute. He immediately became a regular for coach Giorgio Contini's midfield and regularly plays the full 90 minutes. This trust would be rewarded soon, as he supplied his first assist in the third game of the season, a 3-1 victory against FC Lausanne-Sport, and another in the fourth game against city rivals FC Zürich. He shot his first goal on 11 September 2021, in a 1-1 draw, equalizing the game in the 51st minute against FC Luzern. He shot another goal against aforementioned rivals FC Zürich in the second derby of the season, on 23 October 2021. 

In the first half of the season, he supplied a total of five assists, fifth most of all players in the league. He has since become an integral member of the squad's midfield and a mainstay in the starting lineup.

International career
Herc was first recognised as an alternate broader squad member for the senior Slovak national team on 28 September ahead of two 2022 FIFA World Cup qualifiers against Russia and Croatia.

Career statistics

References

External links
 FC DAC 1904 Dunajská Streda official club profile
 
 Futbalnet profile

1998 births
Living people
People from Levice
Sportspeople from the Nitra Region
Slovak footballers
Slovak expatriate footballers
Slovakia youth international footballers
Slovakia under-21 international footballers
Slovakia international footballers
Association football midfielders
Wolverhampton Wanderers F.C. players
FC DAC 1904 Dunajská Streda players
FC Viktoria Plzeň players
MFK Karviná players
Grasshopper Club Zürich players
Slovak Super Liga players
Czech First League players
Swiss Super League players
Expatriate footballers in England
Expatriate footballers in the Czech Republic
Expatriate footballers in Switzerland
Slovak expatriate sportspeople in England
Slovak expatriate sportspeople in the Czech Republic
Slovak expatriate sportspeople in Switzerland